Mary Jane Long, Lady Wilson, OBE (July 31, 1939 – September 3, 2018), known as MJ Long, was an American architect, lecturer and author, best known for her work as a principal architect partner on the British Library in London (with her husband Sir Sandy Wilson). She created a series of purpose-built studios for the artists Peter Blake, RB Kitaj, Paul Huxley and Frank Auerbach, later documenting these in a book. In partnership with Rolfe Kentish, she focused on designing museums, libraries and galleries, including the National Maritime Museum Cornwall, the Jewish Museum London in Camden Town and an extension to Pallant House Gallery. With Wilson, she also co-designed Spring House/Cornford House (1965) in Cambridge, for Christopher Cornford.

Early and family life
Long was born in Summit, New Jersey. She attended Westmount High School, graduated first in class in 1956 in Montreal and later studied at Smith College before enrolling on a four-year architecture course at Yale School of Architecture, studying under Paul Rudolph. It was at Yale that she met Colin St John (Sandy) Wilson, and in 1965 joined his newly formed architecture practice in London. The couple married in 1972. She had two children.

References

1939 births
2018 deaths
20th-century American architects

21st-century American architects

Architects from New Jersey

British Library
People from Summit, New Jersey
Smith College alumni
Yale University alumni